Thomas Henry Raymond Ashton, 2nd Baron Ashton of Hyde JP DL (2 October 1901 – 21 March 1983). The son of Thomas Gair Ashton, 1st Baron Ashton of Hyde and Eva Margaret James. He succeeded his father as 2nd Baron Ashton of Hyde on the latter's death on 1 May 1933. On his death in 1983 he was succeeded in the barony by his son.

Education
He attended Eton College, and New College, Oxford.

Career
He gained the rank of Major with the 1st Royal Gloucestershire Hussars. He held the office of Justice of the Peace for Gloucestershire in 1944, and was Deputy Lieutenant of Gloucestershire in 1957.

Family
He married Marjorie Nell Brooks (1901-1993), daughter of Marshall Jones Brooks and Florence Thomas, on 10 June 1925, and had issue:
Thomas John Ashton, 3rd Baron Ashton of Hyde (1926–2008)
Susan Ashton (b. 1931), died in infancy
Judith Marjorie Ashton (1934–1943)

Notes

References
Kidd, Charles, Williamson, David (editors). Debrett's Peerage and Baronetage (2003 edition). London: Pan Macmillan, 2003., 
'ASHTON OF HYDE', Who Was Who, A & C Black, 1920–2007; online edn, Oxford University Press, Dec 2007

1901 births
1983 deaths
2
People educated at Eton College
Alumni of New College, Oxford
Deputy Lieutenants of Gloucestershire
Royal Gloucestershire Hussars officers
Thomas